DNA primase large subunit is an enzyme that in humans is encoded by the PRIM2 gene.

The replication of DNA in eukaryotic cells is carried out by a complex chromosomal replication apparatus, in which DNA polymerase alpha and primase are two key enzymatic components. Primase, which is a heterodimer of a small subunit and a large subunit, synthesizes small RNA primers for the Okazaki fragments made during discontinuous DNA replication. The protein encoded by this gene is the large, 58 kDa primase subunit.

References

Further reading

External links 
 PDBe-KB provides an overview of all the structure information available in the PDB for Human DNA primase large subunit (PRIM2)